Florence Delaunay, born 1956 in Chinon (Indre-et-Loire), is a French politician.  She was the deputy for Landes's 1st constituency on three occasions, as the substitute candidate for Alain Vidalies, when he was Minister for relations with parliament, and later Transport Minister.  She was the first woman to be a national assembly deputy from Landes.

Biography
Originally from Touraine, she joined the local civil service in 1974 and moved to Aquitaine in 1998 when recruited as director general of services for the municipality of Saint-Sever. In 2002, she was director of services for the Côte Landes Nature community of municipalities, which was called the Community of municipalities of the Canton of Castets when it was created.

Political career
Delaunay has been a municipal councillor in Léon and a Regional Councillor, in addition to her National Assembly service.

External links
Her page on the National Assembly Site

References

1956 births
Living people
Women members of the National Assembly (France)
Deputies of the 13th National Assembly of the French Fifth Republic
Deputies of the 14th National Assembly of the French Fifth Republic
Socialist Party (France) politicians
21st-century French women